Notable people with name Modeste include:

Given name
 André Ernest Modeste Grétry (1741–1813), French composer
 Modeste Demers (1809–1871), Canadian Christian missionary
 Modeste M'bami (born 1982), Cameroonian football player

Surname
 Anthony Modeste (footballer born 1975), Grenadian footballer
 Anthony Modeste (footballer born 1988), French professional footballer
 Jimmy Modeste (born 1981), Cape Verdean soccer defender